Minority Party may refer to:

Minority Party (Denmark)
Ethnic Minority Party of New Zealand
National Minorities Party, India